Ilford was a borough constituency in what is now the London Borough of Redbridge in eastern Greater London. It returned one Member of Parliament (MP)  to the House of Commons of the Parliament of the United Kingdom.  It was created for the 1918 general election, and abolished for the 1945 general election, when it was replaced by the new Ilford North and Ilford South constituencies.

Boundaries

Members of Parliament

Election results

Elections in the 1910s

Elections in the 1920s

 

endorsed by Coalition Government

Elections in the 1930s 

General Election 1939–40

Another General Election was required to take place before the end of 1940. The political parties had been making preparations for an election to take place and by the Autumn of 1939, the following candidates had been selected; 
Conservative: Geoffrey Hutchinson
Labour: James Ranger
British Union: Louise Ann King

In popular culture
In Series 3, Episode 6 of the popular BBC mockumentary programme The Thick Of It, Senior Advisor to Secretary of State Nicola Murray, Glenn Cullen, tells his co-worker Oliver Reader that he is awaiting the verdict on whether he makes the longlist for potential Labour Party candidates for the fictional Ilford East parliamentary constituency.

References

Parliamentary constituencies in London (historic)
Constituencies of the Parliament of the United Kingdom established in 1918
Constituencies of the Parliament of the United Kingdom disestablished in 1945
Politics of the London Borough of Redbridge
Ilford